Motorheart is the seventh studio album by the British hard rock band The Darkness. It was released on 19 November 2021 through Cooking Vinyl.

Background
On 4 June 2021, the band announced they were set to release the new album Motorheart in October. The album was eventually released on 19 November 2021. The album's cover was also unveiled in the announcement. The first single, "Motorheart", was released in August 2021. Along with the album release, the band announced an extensive list of UK tour dates to take place throughout November and December in support of the release of the album.

Critical reception

The album received generally favourable reception, with a score of 70 out of 100 on review aggregator Metacritic from five critics' reviews.

Track listing
 "Welcome Tae Glasgae" – 2:49
 "It's Love, Jim" – 3:23
 "Motorheart" – 4:59
 "The Power and the Glory of Love" – 3:58
 "Jussy's Girl" – 4:09
 "Sticky Situations" – 4:18
 "Nobody Can See Me Cry" – 3:16
 "Eastbound" – 3:36
 "Speed of the Night Time" – 4:52

Deluxe edition bonus tracks
<li> "You Don't Have to Be Crazy About Me... But It Helps" – 3:33
 "It's a Love Thang (You Wouldn't Understand)" – 3:18
 "So Long" – 3:08

Japanese edition bonus track
<li> "The Age of Darkness" – 4:56

Personnel

The Darkness
Justin Hawkins – vocals, lead guitar, synthesisers
Dan Hawkins – guitar, backing vocals
Frankie Poullain – bass, backing vocals
Rufus Tiger Taylor – drums, backing vocals

Additional personnel
Diane Birch – synthesisers, keyboards and backing vocals on "Speed of the Nite Time"
Olga Hübner – strings and string arrangements on "Sticky Situations"
Ralf Hübner – strings on "Sticky Situations"
Mimi Norfolk – backing vocals on "Jussy's Girl"

Production
Dan Hawkins – producer, engineer, mixing
Ian Holland – additional production and engineering
Andy Shillito – additional production and engineering
Chiara Mazzoni – artwork
Simon Emmett – band photo
Luke Insect – design

Charts

References

2021 albums
Cooking Vinyl albums
The Darkness (band) albums